Nathan Royal Scott is a fictional character from the CW television series One Tree Hill created by Mark Schwahn and portrayed by James Lafferty. Following Lucas Scott's departure, Nathan became the main character and central figure of the show. Nathan is Lucas's younger half-brother. He fell in love with Lucas's best friend, Haley James; and they married at the end of the first season. Despite various problems in their relationship, the couple remains together married for most of the shows run, and had a son, Jamie, in season four and a daughter, Lydia, in season eight. Considered to be an anti-hero at the beginning of the first season, Nathan became a much friendlier and more caring person as the series progressed, due to his relationship with Haley and other characters.

Character development

Casting and creation
The writers originally wanted Chad Michael Murray to play Nathan, but he chose to portray Lucas as his mother had abandoned him, which helped him relate to the character. James Lafferty was subsequently cast, as he was a talented basketball player.

Evolution

In the beginning, the character of "Nathan" was described as "cocky and an academically-challenged high school junior". In an interview Lafferty mentioned his thoughts on Nathan and Haley's unlikely relationship, "I think, to start with, the likelihood of the situation, of Nathan and Haley coming together, was so small. In our first few episodes, the characters were worlds apart. It didn't seem like it would be a good fit. But sort of against all odds, they continued to make it work over the years and they fought through adversity. I think they've become a couple that you don't take for granted because they've been up against so much. So you root for them." "Nathan and Haley's fan base is so strong, and there's a reason for that. That couple is gold as far as I'm concerned, and I've felt that way since the very beginning", said Mark Schwahn on the couple. At the end of season three, James Lafferty has said he enjoys playing the rebellious Nathan, which he believes is due to his upbringing and having a father like Dan. He said it's a personality trait he can relate to from his own personality and it's fun to bring it through to Nathan.

Lafferty has said it has been gratifying to play a good family man. "There was definitely a time when Nathan was a villain on the show. I remember not really knowing what the future of the character was going to be, because it seems like on television shows in general, the villain doesn't usually stick around for that long. They're around for as long as it takes the hero to overcome him or defeat him. I was a little bit insecure about what my future on the show would be, but [series creator Mark] Schwahn sort of comforted me. I never could've imagined that it would come to this, that he would be so settled down, and sort of the one present character on the show that's been married for years and has these two children, and such a strong family unit. It's pretty cool to be able to see how far the character has come," said Lafferty regarding the development of Nathan. He also said that if the series wasn't picked up for a ninth season he was happy with how his character's story was wrapped up. Lafferty opted out of returning for the ninth, and final, season as a full-time cast member. Instead, he appeared in 7 out of the thirteen episodes picked up, but continued as a series regular. After some time of speculation, James Lafferty signed on for one extra episode, which was the series finale.

Lafferty has revealed that his favorite episode was "4 Years, 6 Months, 2 Days." He said, "When we came back four years later in the characters' lives and Nathan and Haley had Jamie, it was an exciting atmosphere not really knowing where my character would go. He was in such a dark place and not knowing how the family unit was going to stay together, and then also being able to work with Jackson for the first time — I'll always have fond memories of that."

Character arc

Season 1

In season one, Nathan was introduced as the selfish, jock basketball player for the Tree Hill Ravens. He dated Peyton Sawyer for a significant amount of time, though their relationship is complicated. After his half-brother, Lucas Scott, joins the school basketball team, Nathan feels threatened and goes out of his way to often tease and ridicule him, most often by pointing out how Dan favored him instead of Lucas. Nathan deals with constant pressure to be the best from his father, Dan Scott, who is determined to further Nathan's career. His mother, Deb, was never around in the beginning but tried her best to be there for him when she realized how much pressure he received from Dan. Peyton breaks up with Nathan after she sees the kind of person he is.

Nathan begins receiving tutoring lessons from Lucas' best friend Haley James as a way to upset Lucas. However, he later falls in love with her when she forgives him for taking drugs to enhance his basketball abilities. Throughout the season, Nathan and Haley's relationship blossoms into love, and in the season finale they get married and his relationship with Lucas slowly begins to thaw.

Season 2
Nathan and Haley learn that Dan has had a heart attack. At the hospital, they tell Deb of their marriage after she sees Haley's ring but she is angry and refuses to accept it, nor does Dan when he wakes up. Lucas and Keith return to Tree Hill and Lucas, Peyton and Brooke throw Nathan and Haley a wedding reception while Keith, filling in for Dan at the dealership, takes Nathan on as a mechanic. Haley starts to blossom as a musician but Nathan is jealous of her closeness to fellow musician Chris Keller and warns Chris to stay away from Haley. When Haley's older sister Taylor James comes to Tree Hill, Nathan realizes that Taylor is the girl to whom he lost his virginity several years ago before he had even known Haley. He and Haley fall out about this but later make up.

When Haley mentions that Chris wants her to accompany him on tour, Nathan asks her if she kissed him and she finally admits it. Nathan tells his wife to choose between him and the tour. Haley chooses the tour and leaves Tree Hill. Nathan is devastated and goes on a downward spiral, drinking in class, punching his father and letting Lucas take the fall for his drunk-driving. Nathan finally gets his act together and goes to visit Haley in an attempt to get her to come home but this doesn't work out and he comes back to Tree Hill alone. When Nathan's uncle Cooper (Deb's brother and Nathan's role model) pays a visit to Tree Hill, he takes Nathan and Lucas to a racing track but tragedy strikes when Nathan attempts suicide by deliberately crashing the car. He ends up in hospital where he has a dream of what life would have been like if Dan had married Karen instead of Deb and Nathan and Lucas had grown up in each other's shoes. This dream makes Nathan realize how much he loves his mother. They agree to be strong for each other and Deb goes to rehab to overcome her pill addiction.

Nathan decides to move home and Dan pays his medical bills in exchange for Nathan getting an annulment from Haley. Whitey offers Nathan the opportunity to go to "High Flyers", a prestigious basketball camp, for the summer but Dan tries to talk Nathan out of it, blaming him for Deb's addiction. When Deb learns of this, she and Nathan agree to leave Dan and make a fresh start. Nathan is annoyed that Lucas has been investigating Dan even though Nathan asked him not to. Nathan disowns his brother and moves back home with Deb. In the last episode(s), someone drugs Dan and sets fire to the dealership.

Season 3
Nathan goes to the door and there stands Haley. She returns to Tree Hill for good, but Nathan has not yet forgiven her or Lucas. Nathan learns that Haley is suffering musicians' block and pays Chris to come back to Tree Hill and help Haley with her music. Nathan and Haley grow close again and eventually have makeup sex and get back together. Dan is crowned Mayor of Tree Hill and Deb tells Nathan that she started the dealership fire in an attempt to kill Dan; Nathan is angry with his mother and sends her away for a while to get her life in order. After some inspirational words from Lucas, they gradually begin speaking again, before making up properly. When Jimmy Edwards brings a gun to school, Nathan races inside to find Haley. They are held hostage in the Tutor Center and the deaths of Edwards and Keith leave Nathan and Haley realizing that life is too short. They move back in together and Nathan asks Haley to 'marry' him again, to renew their vows.

While planning their (second) wedding, they receive a visit from Nathan's uncle from his mom's side, Cooper, but are dubious about his relationship with the younger Rachel. Deb returns and she and Nathan take out a restraining order against Dan, which Nathan initiating, while Nathan beats old "High Flyers" rival Damien West in an all-important game. On the morning of his wedding, Nathan is traumatized following a nightmare where Haley was drowning and he couldn't save her. He gets Lucas to keep a close eye on Haley but all goes well and they renew their vows, though Rachel causes a scene at the reception over Cooper sleeping with her despite her age. Nathan and Haley head to London for their honeymoon and Haley has something to tell Nathan but before he gets to hear it, they have a near-collision with Cooper and Rachel (in the wedding limo) on the Mollina Bridge. Nathan dives into the water to rescue his uncle but becomes trapped and is left gasping for air and fighting for his life.

Season 4
Nathan wakes up in the hospital and is hailed as a hero for saving Rachel and Cooper. However, Nathan does not believe that he did save them - he thinks Keith did as he believes he saw Keith in the water. Rachel develops a crush on Nathan for him looking like Cooper and sets out to seduce him, using his confusion over Keith to her advantage. What Haley had wanted to tell Nathan while they were driving to the airport on their (second) wedding day, was that she was pregnant. Finally, she tells Nathan on the same day that he gets a scholarship to Duke University. He is initially annoyed that she kept it from him, but is later delighted and tells Rachel that she never had a chance with him. Nathan and Haley face even more money difficulties now that they have a baby on the way and when Dan refuses to help, Nathan turns to a loan shark, Daunte Jones. He provides Nathan with money in exchange for Nathan losing the State Championship. He plays badly, causing his team to trail behind drastically in points. Haley talks with him and reveals the sex of their baby by saying "...as long as you're a good husband and father.... to your son. It's a boy, Nathan, you're gonna have a son!" Nathan decides to play his best for his son, and the Ravens win the championship with Lucas scoring the winning shot.

Afterwards, Daunte, angry about Nathan's failure by not losing, tries to run him over with his car. Haley pushes him out of the way and is struck herself. Furious, Nathan beats Daunte with his fists. Dan stops him and covers for his son by pounding the ground, which breaks his hand. He is arrested for the beating of Daunte, who dies. (It is later revealed at the autopsy that the crash is what killed Daunte, not Nathan's beating.) Meanwhile, as the paramedics are working on Haley, Lucas falls unconscious after he went into cardiac arrest. They are both rushed to the hospital. In the next episode, Haley wakes up and an ultrasound is done to check the baby. They hear the heartbeat, proving that the baby is indeed fine. After Deb attempts suicide by taking an overdose, Nathan is racked with guilt. He and Haley decide to help Deb by moving out of their apartment and into the Scott mansion.

A party is thrown on the night before prom. A tape of Nathan's basketball glories is played, but Nathan is horrified when it also reveals footage of him having sex with Brooke Davis at a time when he and Peyton had just broken up. Haley asks Nathan to make a list of his conquests and Nathan tells Haley that she is the only one he loved. Haley forgives Nathan and they kiss and then go to the prom together. After Mouth sends a text saying he needs help, the gang goes to Honey Grove, Texas, where Nathan and Haley have their dream prom. When they get back home, Nathan tells Lucas that an investigator has been calling him about point shaving and they are looking at Lucas. Lucas decides to take the fall after Haley asks him to. When Nathan finds out, he decides to come forward because he doesn't want to end up like Dan, putting his future in front of everybody else. He holds a press conference about the point shaving, which causes him to lose his scholarship. Nathan soon finds out from Deb that Dan killed Keith. When he confronts Dan about it, Dan doesn't deny it and Nathan, in anger, disowns him and says he died the day Keith died. Whitey decides to help Nathan achieve his college basketball dreams. Whitey accepts a coaching position with a nearby college and asks Nathan to be his star recruit. During graduation, Haley goes into labor in the middle of her valedictorian speech. In the season finale, Haley gives birth to their son, James Lucas Scott, on June 13, 2007 (their graduation day).

At their graduation party, Haley tells Brooke that she was chosen to be the godmother, which she happily accepts. Later on the roof, Lucas and Nathan exchange pictures of their new family members and consider confronting Dan in jail, but agree that they will never do so. Lucas reveals that he will be Whitey's assistant coach. After the party, everyone heads to the River Court where Lucas and Nathan prepare for a one on one game. The season ends with Nathan jumping to shoot a basket and Lucas trying to block it. It's unknown if he made that shot or who won. The game was a tribute to the first one-on-one game between the two Scott brothers, which led to Lucas joining the Ravens and the start of everything.

Missing years
In his first year of college, Nathan won his first National Championship, coached by Lucas and Whitey, trying to make people forget he had shaved points back in the days. He almost got into a fight with rival fans after it, but Lucas held him back and Whitey advised him to control his temper or he would end up like Dan. 
Eventually Nathan Scott played for the University of Maryland Terrapins men's basketball team, where, as a First Team All-American, he led the team to the NCAA Division I Men's Basketball Championship. Three years later Nathan was all set to be the tenth pick in the NBA draft by the Seattle SuperSonics. One night he went to a party at a bar with Lucas and Haley to celebrate his new shoe deal, shoes called "the NS 23's". When Haley left to watch their son Jamie, fans of Portland, a rival NBA team, pretended they wanted an autograph from Nathan, only to mock him. When things escalated, he almost walked away thanks to Lucas, but the rival fans made a nasty comment about Haley, and he defended his wife and a fight ensued. Thrown through a plate glass window, he screamed he couldn't feel his legs and consequently his NBA career was over before it started.

Season 5
After his accident that left him paralyzed, Nathan has become an angered alcoholic. He's grown his hair long and has a scruffy beard. He gets into an argument with Haley, saying that he lost everything and has nothing. Haley angrily tells him that he still has her and Jamie, but if he keeps this up, he will definitely have nothing because Haley says that she can't keep living like this. When he realizes that he failed Jamie by not being there for his soap box derby, Nathan decides to get his life back to what it used to be. He also teaches Jamie how to not be afraid. He then pays a visit to Dan to tell him he is over with him for good. To prove that he is going to get his family back, he cooks Haley dinner, and shaves. Haley, happy to see her husband back, tells him that she missed him and they all sit down to eat. Nathan also starts playing basketball with Jamie.

Nathan decides to assist talented yet troublesome Tree Hill High School student Quentin Fields as he reminds him of his former self. He even confronts him, telling Fields how much he regrets his own mistakes, and convinces him to go back to school. His temper gets the best of him again when Jason, a musician in a band, touches Haley's rear. Quentin comes to her aid, punching Jason, which also damages his hand, putting him out of basketball for some time. Haley, however, is disappointed about Nathan's temper.

After he has been hit on several times by Jamie's nanny, Carrie, Haley walks in on them in the shower. He tells her that Carrie snuck into the shower without his knowledge, which is the truth. But Carrie insists that she and Nathan are in love, angering Haley, which gets them both kicked out. Some time later, Nathan has an argument with Haley. During this time, Jamie falls into the pool, nearly drowning. Nathan and Haley soon look out the window to see him lying face down in the pool. Rushing to his aid, Nathan jumps in and pulls Jamie out. As Haley is sitting on the ground with Jamie in her arms, she angrily tells him that she wants a divorce. Later at Lucas and Lindsey's bachelor(ette) party she realizes she can't change him, leaving him distraught on the spot. When Jamie is kidnapped on Lucas' wedding day, Haley and Nathan turn to each other for comfort; they believe that it was Dan who took him and aren't aware that it was actually Carrie. They fear that they will never see Jamie again. However, Jamie returns home, and Jamie tells his parents that it was Dan who brought him home.
Nathan and Lucas attack Dan outside after he walks in with Jamie.

After they reconnect, Nathan and Haley start marriage counseling. In counseling, Nathan admits that he wants Haley to look at him the way she used to. He realizes all his mistakes and tell Haley he loves her, and they make up. After Jamie's birthday party, he learns Dan is dying, but tells him he is done with him, proving that he really doesn't care if Dan dies, but is sorry that he is. He then begins working on his come-back, although he refuses to have it called so.

Season 6
With Quentin's help, Nathan quickly gets back into shape with his basketball technique. Quentin has also befriended Jamie, who looks up to him. Unfortunately, Quentin is fatally shot while interrupting a store robbery. Nathan and Haley tell Jamie together and they also decide to take him to the funeral because Jamie wants to say goodbye. During this time, Nathan finds out that Deb and Skills are in a relationship, which disgusts him. The revelation strains his friendship with Skills but after a talk with Jamie, he comes to terms with their relationship. To ease it, Skills decides to help Nathan with his comeback. Nathan soon gets a call from the general manager of an NBA D-League basketball team in Fort Wayne (the Fort Wayne Mad Ants), who says that they are interested in recruiting him. Once Nathan gets there, he is disappointed to hear they want him as a coach, not as a player. Nathan turns down the position but is soon asked to play Slamball by Owen (Brooke Davis' ex).

After some hesitation, Nathan starts to play Slamball. Haley is afraid he'll hurt his back. Her worry intensifies when she sees some severe bruises on his back. Then, after a game, an old rival charges at Nathan and pushes him through a glass window in front of his wife and son. Scared that his father almost ended up badly injured, Jamie makes him promise that he will stop playing Slamball. On the night of the USO concert, Nathan is at his home talking with the spirit of "Q" as he watches the Slamball championships on television. Q asks if he really gave it up for Jamie or because he stopped believing in himself. After Q's pep talk, Nathan asks Haley to promise him that they won't be afraid of chasing their dreams.

Nathan attends a trial for D-League basketball and after initially getting turned away for not belonging to a team, he is called back by the general manager who had earlier offered him the coaching position. After a successful trial, Nathan is selected to play for the Charleston Chiefs. Teammate Devon Fox threatens Nathan, and says he's not going to be taking his spot. After struggling during the training session, Nathan returns to his locker to see his photos of Haley and Jamie ripped up, as well as one of him and Quentin. Angered and spurred on, Nathan threatens Devon, saying that he's going to take his spot and Devon can have it back after Nathan is called up to the NBA. Later in the season, when Devon ruins five straight games for the Chiefs, the coach benches him. Nathan is put in and makes an assist that leads to the winning shot. Devon is later cut from the team and his starting position is given to Nathan, whose back up is Neno, who taunted Nathan at the tryouts. Nathan and Neno prove to be the team's two best players, but they play the same position, so they can't both start. The coach has Nathan teach Neno how to play shooting guard. An NBA scout from the Los Angeles Clippers comes to see the two of them play, but Nathan is worried that he won't play his best in front of the scout, so he opts to drive the ball in for Neno to score. Neno is later called up by the Clippers, leaving Nathan still in the D-League. In the season 6 finale, Nathan gets called up to the Charlotte Bobcats and starts in his first game up.

Season 7
Nathan has been playing for the Charlotte Bobcats since the finale of season 6, but his contract is up and his friend and agent, Clay, puts Nathan's career in jeopardy by being too greedy during the negotiations. Nathan, Haley, and Jamie celebrate Jamie's 7th birthday, and a woman named Renee asks to take a picture with Nathan. Later, the woman tells Clay that she slept with Nathan. After doubting Nathan and offering to pay Renee off, Haley decides to support him and not pay her anything. Dan and Rachel convince Renee to come onto Dan's talk show to tell her side of the story. In a surprising turn of events, Dan submits Renee to a lie detector test, and all of the answers she gives come across as being true. He goads her into revealing that she had sex the night of the party and got pregnant, but not by Nathan. All hopes seem lost as the NBA rosters are filled up, Clay gets news that Joe Turner, an NBA player wants to stay in his hometown to care for his ailing mother. Clay then gets Sacramento Kings to offer Nathan a contract for 15 million and then trade Joe and Nathan back to Charlotte Bobcats for Derek McDaniels. This move helps Nathan to stay in the NBA and Joe close to home. Before Dan leaves Tree Hill for good, Nathan brings Jamie to say goodbye and thanks his dad for helping him get back into the NBA.

Later in the season, Nathan helps Haley and James come to terms with Haley's mother's death. Nathan also spends a day bonding with Jamie, who asks Nathan about his relationship with Lucas. Nathan replies that although they were not close when they were younger, they became more like real brothers as they got older. In addition, he finds out Jamie would like a brother or sister. Haley then confesses to Nathan that she took a pregnancy test that morning, but it turned out negative. Still distraught over her mother's death, Haley jumps into the swimming pool hoping to feel emotion again. Nathan gets to her just in time and pulls her out of the pool after she has flashbacks about her life with Nathan. On a trip to Utah, Haley begins to get through her depression and is overjoyed when she finds out she's pregnant. Haley tells Nathan she thinks the baby is a girl.

Season 8
In Season 8, Nathan desperately tries to help a wounded Clay by donating his kidney, even if it means he will never play basketball again. He soon finds out he isn't a match. After Clay wakes up, Nathan tells Haley he has back pains and decides to quit basketball and become an agent. He soon becomes an agent and signs his first client. Nathan goes back to college, and isn't well-liked by his college professor, Dr. August Kellerman. He then starts to gain respect and gets the hang of college, with the help of Jamie. He then wants to sign Kellerman's son Ian, who is a baseball player. He is really good, but he is the life of the party.

Nathan wanted Ian to sign with him, but Dr. Kellerman told him not to. He goes to Ian's house with Clay and engages in a game of beer pong with him. After the game, Ian signs the contract and Nathan asked to go to the bathroom. Nathan goes to find it and finds the garage instead. Going inside, he finds a vintage Jeep Grand Wagoneer with front-end damage. He approaches it and finds an empty bottle of whiskey on the floor in front of the driver's seat. He realizes that is the car that hit Brooke and Jamie, knocking them off the bridge, almost killing them. He confronts Professor Kellerman, who at first denies involvement, but then admits responsibility a short time later in a separate meeting.

Afterwards, Clay, Nathan, and Ian gather at a local bar, where Ian buys shots for everyone. When Nathan asks what they're drinking, Ian tells him the brand name of the whiskey, which Nathan finds to be consistent with the brand on the bottle found in the Jeep, and concludes that his professor was lying about his involvement in the crash to cover up for his son. Nathan also becomes a father once again when Haley has Lydia Bob Scott.

Season 9
In Season 9, after returning home from traveling for Clay's company to scout athletes, Nathan returns home to find that Dan is living under his roof and learns that Haley let him move in after his diner burned down. Nathan understands Haley's reasons for letting Dan move in because he says she has "a good heart" and that is just the kind of person she is. Nathan volunteers to scout in Europe, since Clay can't go after learning he is sick and is sleepwalking to the point of waking up in various parts of Tree Hill. However, before he leaves, Nathan tells Dan he wants him out of his house by the time he returns home in a week.

While in Europe, Nathan goes off-course after seeing the European players aren't as good as he thought they were, and goes to Eastern Europe to sign a player, only to fail to sign him. Nathan chats with Haley and Lydia via webcam before leaving Europe, showing them both a pink moose he bought to bring back home for Lydia as a gift. Upon returning to Tree Hill, Nathan is kidnapped outside Tree Hill Airport and drops the pink moose while struggling to break free. After learning why he was kidnapped, his failure signing in Europe, Nathan argues with his kidnapper, contract killer Dimitri, to let him go. Dimitri tells Nathan when the phone rings, he will die. Nathan yells at Dimitri when the phone rings and tells him not to be his "boss's bitch." He begs Dimitri to let him pay him money to let him go, but Dimitri finds a better way to make money off Nathan's ransom. He contacts his associates back in Europe who will pay to have Nathan killed. Dimitri soon brings up Haley, referring to her as a "whore," causing Nathan to threaten to kill him if he hurts her.

Nathan makes an escape attempt after fooling Dimitri and knocking him unconscious. Nathan is almost caught by the drug dealer that Dan and Clay confronted, Billy. As Nathan tries to find an exit and escape, he encounters Officer Stevens (the officer that is working on his missing case) in the building. Nathan takes the gun the officer gives him and Officer Stevens tells Nathan to go out the exit in a room and find his squad car and quickly leave saying that he'll catch up. Nathan follows the officer's instructions and comes face to face with Dimitri. Nathan tries to fire the gun only to find it empty causing him to realize everything is actually a trap. The officer then appears behind him and strikes Nathan in the head with a pipe, knocking him unconscious. Nathan regains consciousness as Officer Stevens is tying him to a chair, and asks the officer why he's working with them. Officer Stevens then reveals he's on the gangsters payroll. He punches Nathan in the abdomen and tells Nathan that "this pays much better" and that he will indeed die. Nathan looks at Officer Stevens and Dimitri, fear filling his eyes as he realizes that he may never escape and that he might actually die. Nathan's mouth is then taped up and Officer Stevens whispers in his ear, "Your wife says hi," before covering Nathan's head with a black hood.

Dan later comes to Nathan's rescue, with the help of Julian and Chris Keller. Dan manages to make his way to Nathan by killing most of Dimitri's men. As they are about to leave, Dimitri catches up to them and fires a shot at Nathan, but not before Dan can jump between them and take the bullet intended for his son. Dan secretly gives Nathan his gun, which Nathan then uses to shoot and kill a distracted Dimitri. Officer Stevens comes to the scene, holding Nathan at gunpoint, but is knocked out cold by Julian. The series finale shows Nathan and Haley continuing to lead happy lives after Nathan's kidnapping, and also shows a final kiss in the rain between the pair.

In a flashforward, Nathan and Haley are still happily married and Haley still owns Karen's Cafe. The show ends with Nathan, Haley and Lydia watching Jamie's high school basketball game where it is revealed that Jamie beat Nathan's scoring record. The show has come full circle with Nathan watching Jamie compete in a basketball game, the way Dan used to watch Nathan. However, it is made clear that Nathan would never put pressure on Jaime like his father did. It is also shown that Nathan now has what Dan wanted (a loving wife and kids) but will not make the same mistakes as him.

Reception
BuddyTV ranked him #12 in its list of the "15 TV's Hottest Dads" but was described as not the best father for initially ignoring his family after his accident, though he does redeem himself afterwards.

See also
List of fictional supercouples
Quotes

References

One Tree Hill (TV series) characters
Fictional basketball players
Fictional characters from North Carolina
Television characters introduced in 2003
Fictional teenage parents
Male characters in television
American male characters in television
Jock characters

sv:One Tree Hill#Nathan Scott